The equal-field system or land-equalization system was a system of land ownership and distribution in China used from the Northern Wei to the mid-Tang dynasty.

By the Han dynasty, the well-field system of land distribution had fallen out of use in China though reformers like Wang Mang tried to restore it. The equal-field system was introduced into practice around 485 AD by the Emperor Xiaowen of Northern Wei under the support of Empress Dowager Feng during the Northern and Southern dynasties period. The system was eventually adopted by other regimes, and its use continued into the Sui and Tang dynasties.

Basis
The system worked on the basis that most land was owned by the government, which would then assign it to individual families. All individuals, including slaves, were entitled to a certain amount of land, the amount depending on their ability to supply labor. For example, able-bodied men received 40 mu of land (around 1.1 hectares or 2.7 acres), and women received less, and more land was granted per ox owned by the family. After they died, the land would revert to the state to be reassigned, but provisions were allowed for inheritance of land that required long-term development, such as farms for mulberry trees (for silkworms).

The system was intended to foster the development of land and to ensure that no agricultural land lay neglected. That prevented aristocrats from developing large power bases by monopolizing the fields and allowed the common people to take part of the land and ensure their livelihood. It also allowed the government to develop a tax base and slowed the accumulation of land by vast, untaxable estates. It was also used by the Tang dynasty to break the dynastic cycle, the idea that all dynasties would end. Having people receive the land from the government would make them feel that the government gave them something even though it never left.

Fall into disuse
The system eventually began falling out of use after the An Lushan rebellion as the central government began to lose centralized control over its territories. Though all land theoretically belonged to the Imperial government, the aristocratic families were able to legally acquire land, and were able to build up their holdings. Buddhist monasteries also came to control vast estates of agricultural lands. Peasants often entered the households of landlords and became tenant farmers or servants during times of natural disasters and conflict to ensure their own security. The gradual loss of taxable lands is a reason for the decline of the Tang dynasty. The pattern of landlords holding lands worked by tenant farmers would continue throughout the rest of Chinese history until the founding of the People's Republic of China in 1949.

Adoption in Japan
The equal-field system was adopted by Japan during the Taika Period as a result of the Taika reforms made by Prince Shotoku Taishi (see Ritsuryo), though it is debatable to what degree it was actually implemented. Provinces close to the capital were more strictly regulated and taxed, prompting farmers to flee to outlying provinces. In Japan, too, the system fell out of use as land reverted to private ownership; decrees in 723 held that newly developed lands could be inherited for three generations while a later decree in 743 allowed for these developed lands to be held in perpetuity. By 800 the land redistribution scheme was practically abandoned as census and distribution became infrequent and irregular. Nonetheless, the system remained in existence, at least in theory, well after that.

See also 
Well-field system
Open field system
 Agriculture in China
 Economy of China
 Economic history of China (Pre-1911)
 Economic history of China (1912–1949)

References

Ancient Chinese institutions
History of agriculture
Economic history of China
Agriculture in China
Sui dynasty
Tang dynasty
Northern Wei
Northern Qi
Northern Zhou
Land reform